Konartakhteh (also Romanized as Konārtakhteh, Konār Takhteh, and Kunār Takhteh) is a city and capital of Kamaraj and Konartakhteh District, in Kazerun County, Fars Province, Iran.  At the 2006 census, its population was 6,690, in 1,477 families.

References

Populated places in Kazerun County

Cities in Fars Province